Annemiek Bekkering (born 5 August 1991) is a former Dutch competitive sailor. She competed at the 2016 Summer Olympics in Rio de Janeiro, in the women's 49erFX.

On November 29 2021, she announced her retirement of the professional sailing sport.

References

External links
 
 
 

1991 births
Living people
Dutch female sailors (sport)
Olympic sailors of the Netherlands
Sailors at the 2016 Summer Olympics – 49er FX
Sailors at the 2020 Summer Olympics – 49er FX
Olympic bronze medalists for the Netherlands
Olympic medalists in sailing
Medalists at the 2020 Summer Olympics
49er FX class sailors
World champions in sailing for the Netherlands
49er FX class world champions
20th-century Dutch women
20th-century Dutch people
21st-century Dutch women